Knorr may refer to:

Knorr (surname)
Knorr (brand), a brand of foods and beverages, particularly known for dehydrated broth
Knorr-Bremse, manufacturer of braking systems for rail and commercial vehicles
R/V Knorr, the ship used to find the wreck of the Titanic
Knorr Arena, in Heilbronn, Germany
Knorr, older spelling of Knarr, a type of Viking cargo ship
Koenigs–Knorr reaction, the substitution reaction of a glycosyl halide with an alcohol to give a glycoside
Knorr pyrrole synthesis, a widely used chemical reaction that synthesizes substituted pyrroles
Paal–Knorr synthesis, a reaction that generates either furans, pyrroles, or thiophenes from 1,4-diketones
Knorr quinoline synthesis, an intramolecular organic reaction converting a β-ketoanilide to a 2-hydroxyquinoline using sulfuric acid